Lupinus luteus is known as annual yellow-lupin, European yellow lupin or yellow lupin. It is native to the Mediterranean region of Southern Europe.

Distribution
It occurs on mild sandy and volcanic soils in mining belts. As a wild plant, it is widespread over the coastal area in the western part of the Iberian Peninsula, Morocco, Tunisia, and Algeria, on the islands of Corsica, Sardinia and Sicily and in Southern Italy. It is most likely that in Israel and Lebanon it has turned wild. Cultivated in Northern Europe and the CIS (Belarus and Ukraine) as well as, on a smaller scale, in Western Australia and South Africa. Having previously been cultivated in southern France and on Madeira, it has turned wild there. 
Using combinations of such characters as the colour of the corolla, the carina's edge, vegetative organs and seeds, 18 varieties, 4 subvarieties and 6 forms have been identified.
The plant's yellow seeds, known as lupin beans, were once a common food of the Mediterranean basin and Latin America. Today they are primarily eaten as a pickled snack food.

Uses 
Yellow lupin is mainly cultivated to feed livestock and poultry, and is also used as an ornamental plant.

References 

Kurlovich B.S. 2002. Lupins. Geography, classification, genetic resources and breeding, St. Petersburg, “Intan”, 468p. http://personal.inet.fi/tiede/lupin/
Gladstones, J.S. 1998. Distribution, Origin, Taxonomy, History and Importance. In: J.S. Gladstones et al. (eds.), Lupin as Crop Plants. Biology, Production and Utilization, 1-39.

External links 

Plants for a Future: PFAF treatment of Lupinus luteus
USDA PLANTS: Profile for Lupinus luteus (European yellow lupine)
Classification for Kingdom Plantae Down to Genus Lupinus "L".
Lupinus luteus Israel Wildflowers

luteus
Flora of Italy
Edible legumes
Garden plants of Europe
Plants described in 1753
Taxa named by Carl Linnaeus